Rebolledo de la Torre is a municipality and town located in the province of Burgos, Castile and León, Spain. According to the 2004 census (INE), the municipality has a population of 167 inhabitants.

See also
Páramos (comarca)

References

Municipalities in the Province of Burgos